Analectis pala is an extinct lamprid of the Family Turkmenidae.  Its fossils are found from Late Oligocene strata from what is now Turkmenistan.  Analectis, as with the other members of Turkmenidae, was a close relative of the opahs.

References
 "The first fossil ribbonfish (Teleostei, Lampridiformes, Trachipteridae)"

External links
 Analectis at the Paleobiology Database

Turkmenidae
Oligocene fish of Asia
Fossil taxa described in 1980